Cyperus sphacelatus is a species of sedge that is native to parts of Africa and Central America and South America.

The species was first formally described by the botanist Christen Friis Rottbøll in 1773.

See also 
 List of Cyperus species

References 

sphacelatus
Taxa named by Christen Friis Rottbøll
Plants described in 1773
Flora of Angola
Flora of Benin
Flora of Bolivia
Flora of Brazil
Flora of Burkina Faso
Flora of Burundi
Flora of Cameroon
Flora of Colombia
Flora of the Central African Republic
Flora of the Democratic Republic of the Congo
Flora of the Republic of the Congo
Flora of Costa Rica
Flora of Cuba
Flora of the Dominican Republic
Flora of Ecuador
Flora of Gabon
Flora of Equatorial Guinea
Flora of French Guiana
Flora of Ghana
Flora of Guinea-Bissau
Flora of Guyana
Flora of Guinea
Flora of Honduras
Flora of Haiti
Flora of Ivory Coast
Flora of Liberia
Flora of Jamaica
Flora of Madagascar
Flora of Mali
Flora of Mauritania
Flora of Niger
Flora of Nicaragua
Flora of Peru
Flora of Puerto Rico
Flora of Panama
Flora of Senegal
Flora of Sierra Leone
Flora of Suriname
Flora of Trinidad
Flora of Togo
Flora of Tanzania
Flora of Venezuela
Flora of Uganda
Flora of Zambia
Flora without expected TNC conservation status